Chahardangeh District may refer to:
 Chahardangeh District (Hurand County), East Azerbaijan province
 Chahardangeh District (Mazandaran Province)
 Chahardangeh District (Eslamshahr County), Tehran province

See also
 Chahardangeh Rural District (disambiguation)